If I'm Lucky  is an album by saxophonist Zoot Sims with pianist Jimmy Rowles, recorded in 1977 for the Pablo label.

Reception

AllMusic awarded the album 4 stars, and its review by Scott Yanow calls it an "enjoyable straight-ahead date". On All About Jazz Marc Barnett described the album as "Gorgeous improvisations on some beautiful yet rarely played songs". The Penguin Guide to Jazz selected this album as part of its suggested Core Collection.

Track listing
 "(I Wonder) Where Our Love Has Gone" (Buddy Johnson) - 4:54
 "Legs" (Neal Hefti) - 6:31   
 "If I'm Lucky" (Eddie DeLange, Josef Myrow) - 5:29
 "Shadow Waltz" (Harry Warren, Al Dubin) - 5:34
 "You're My Everything" (Warren, Mort Dixon, Joe Young) - 5:26
 "It's All Right With Me" (Cole Porter) - 6:54
 "Gypsy Sweetheart" (Mitchell Parish) - 4:18
 "I Hear a Rhapsody" (Jack Baker, George Fragos, Dick Gasparre) - 6:28

Personnel 
Zoot Sims - tenor saxophone 
Jimmy Rowles - piano
George Mraz - bass
Mousey Alexander - drums

References 

1977 albums
Jimmy Rowles albums
Zoot Sims albums
Pablo Records albums
Albums produced by Norman Granz